The Castletown River is a river which flows through the town of Dundalk, County Louth, Ireland. It rises near Newtownhamilton, County Armagh, Northern Ireland, and is known as the Creggan River in its upper reaches. Its two main tributaries are the Kilcurry and Falmore rivers and it enters the Irish Sea at Dundalk Bay.

Angling
The river features wild brown trout, sea trout and salmon and is also stocked with brown trout. Fishing is controlled by the Dundalk Brown Trout Angling Association.

See also
List of rivers in Ireland

References

External links

Salmon fishing on the River Castletown (Courtbane), from Salmon Ireland

Rivers of County Louth
Rivers of County Armagh